Knurl is the noise music project of Canadian experimental composer Alan Bloor. Based in Quebec, the composer has been performing and recording as Knurl since 1994, the year of project's seminal harsh noise release "Initial Shock." 

As Knurl, Alan Bloor has released over one hundred albums internationally and has performed with Jim O'Rourke and Thurston Moore. He has also played in festivals and performances worldwide in countries such as Japan, Turkey, and the United States.

Biography
Alan Bloor, originally from Windsor, Ontario, was involved in several bands in the early 80s, including a hardcore punk band called Binge of Violence. After Binge of Violence's breakup, Bloor pursued a career as a solo musician, studying jazz bass, as well as classical and flamenco guitar.  In the late 1980s he began performing noise backgrounds at poetry readings in Detroit, Michigan. While performing, Bloor experimented with his bass guitar by placing metal objects on the strings to alter the timbre of the instrument (a technique often called prepared guitar).

Since that time, Bloor has delved heavily into experimentation with found objects as sound sources, including fan blades, typewriters, scrap metal and car springs. He has also supplied musical scores for performers Andrew Hammerson (ex DV-8)  and Jake Brown, from the UK and Montreal respectively. 

Since the beginning of 1995, Bloor has been performing solo as Knurl in Canada, the U.S, and abroad. Bloor has explored a less harsh side of noise music in his acclaimed ambient music project called Pholde.

Music

Bloor's objective with his project, Knurl, is to take music and strip it entirely of its rhythm, melody, vocals, even production quality which is most associated with music today. Bloor records and performs without the assistance of computers, synthesizers or samplers.  Labels that have released Knurl material include Alien8 Recordings, RRRecords, Solipsism, Harshnoise, Troniks, Gameboy, and 
Obscurica.

Partial discography
 Initial Shock  1994 Self released- cas.
Tetramatrix  1994 Self released- cas.
 Nervescrap  1994 Self released cassette, and later on Pure as a CD. 
 Diapason- 1995 Self released- cass.
 Meatrag- 1995 Self released -cass.
 Infraneuroma-1995-Self rel. -cass.
 Headgrate -1995- Deadline-cass.
 Chain meal 1&2-1995-Self rel. cas.
 Inelastic Scattering-1996- Self Abuse Records - cass.
 Hyperflux -1996- Self rel. cass.
Flat Bastard- 1996- Self rel. 2xcas.
 Supravital Mephitis-1996-Self rel. cass.
Paraphasm-1996- Self rel. cass.
Recycled-1996- RRR cass.
HearingTrumpet/Knurl-1997-Misanthropy- 7”
Synovial Nematics-1997- Panta Rhei-cass.
Intrasyntax-1997-Panta Rhei- cass.
Preparative Suppletion-1997- Panta Rhei- cass.
Interdisciplinary Optromorphide-1997- Xerxes- cass.
Aube/Knurl- 1997- Alien 8 Rec. CD
Phylomonoperistalside-1998- Xerxes- CD-R
Floritura Deuteranopia-1998- Solispsism-CD-R 
Symbioplexus-1998- Labyrinth-cass.
Dimorphic Multiplicity-1999- Betley Welcomes Careful Drivers- cass.
Torus-1999-Alien8 Recordings-CD-R 
Periodic Nephromucilaginosity-1999-Total Zero- CD  
Plank-1999-Spite Rec.- cass.
Exotosemia-1999-Cohort Rec.-CD-R 
Government Alpha/Knurl-2000- M Recordings- CD-R.
Nocicept-2000- Panta Rhei- CD-R 
Kharborundumm-2000-Panta Rhei-CD-R 
Kurtosis-2002-Harshnoise Rec.-CDR
Thymostat-2002-Panta Rhei-cdr 
Knurl/Koryphaia-2002- Galactique Rec. CD 
Magnetomotive-2003-Gameboy Rec.- cdr 
Revoltion-2003-Panta Rhei-mini cdr
Vorticose-2003-Panta Rhei- cdr 
Cytostatic-2004-Panta Rhei-cdr
Triapse-2005-Panta Rhei- cdr
Paramecium-2005-Panta Rhei- cdr 
Chromosytoma-2005-Panta Rhei-cdr
Acidamide-2005-Harshnoise Rec. cdr 
Hematoma-2005-Obscurica-cdr 
Scyamine-2006-PACRec/Troniks-CD 
Lectophysis-2006-Pitchphase-mini cdr 
Subluxation-2007-Wintage Rec.-cdr
Hyperplasia-2007-Brise-cul Rec.-cdr
Invection-2007-Skeleton Dust Rec.-cdr
Vermifuge-2007-PACRec/Troniks-CD
Knurl/Mabus-2007-Wintage Rec.-cass.
Triboluminescence-2008-Brise-cul Rec.-cdr  
A Hail of Blades-2008-Impulsy Stetoskopu- cdr
Mesosoma-2009-Impulsy Setoskopu- cdr 
Knurl/ Buried Machine-2009-Wintage Rec.-cass.
Dichromatism-2009-Panta Rhei—cdr  
Thiocarbamide-2010-Phage Tapes-CD 
Reactance-2011-Wintage Rec.-LP
Obturation-2011-Inyrdisk-mini cdr 
Halometh-2011-Cohort Rec.-CD
Tetrothema-2011-Banned Prod.-cass.
Pyrolysis-2012-Terror Rec.-cass.
Metasynogen-2013-Audio Dissection-cass.
Knurl/RDCD-2014-TrangSao-cdr
Knurl/Zyzaxom-2015-TrangSao-cdr
Retinomatosis-2015-Danvers State Rec. cass.
Thoracia-2015-Emergentism-cass.
Ectodurotomy-2015-New Forces Rec. -cass
Acetylphasia-2015-Impulsy Stetoskopu- cass.
Standard Deviation-2016-Oxen Rec.-cass
Knurl/Zyzaxom-2016-Bandcamp 
Thirunantha-2016-Panta Rhei-Bandcamp
Parasphere-2016-Panta Rhei- Bandcamp
Methaphase-2016-New Forces-2xcass.
Acceptance of the Existence-2016-Level of Vulnerability-cass  
Interthiodide-2016-PantaRhei-cdr 
Knurl/Armenia/Macronympha-2016-Bizarre Audio Arts- cass
Abrasive Interludes-2016-Temporary Trisomy Rec.- mini cdr  
The Closed Interval-2017-No Rent Rec.-cass.
Divaritrance-2017-Walnut&Locust-mini cdr 
Phenohalasin-2017-Terror Rec.-cass.
Knurl/Ames Sanglantes-2017-PantaRhei-cass.
Primary Halciation-2018-PantaRhei-Bandcamp 
Knurl/Hybrid Frequency-2018-Label unknown-cass.
Themes for a Car Crash-2018-Dark Days Ahead-cdr
Chromiumiophage-2019-Foul Prey-cass.
A Turbulent Obsession-2019-Absurd Exposition-cass
Risk of Entrapment-2019-4ib Rec.-CD 
Periphoric Strain-2019-No Rent Rec.-cass.
A Modicum of Joy-2019-Petit Soles-cass.
The Partial Exception-2020-PantaRhei-Bandcamp, Trashfuck Rec.- cdr 
The Tide of Unreason-2020-PantaRhei-Bandcamp 
Lathyrism-2020-Nefarious Activities-cass.
Initial Shock(re-release)-2020-Absurd Exposition-CD/DVD 
Various Artists-2020-New Forces-CD 
Knurl/Godpussy-2020-Tribe Tapes-cass.
Plasmacyanin-2020-PantaRhei-Bandcamp 
Vengeance Bades Weary-2020-PantaRhei-Bandcamp 
Enchantments-2020-SGFF Rec.-cass.
Phenalsyasis- 2021-Pantarhei- Bandcamp 
The Now Sacred Turmoil-2021- AAD Records- CD
Cryocarbazine- June, 2021-
Rural Isolation Project.

External links
 Knurl on label site Alien8 Recordings
 Knurl on label site Obscurica
 Knurl and Pholde featured in Toronto's "Ambient Ping", with MP3 samples from both Bloor projects.

Canadian experimental musical groups
Musical groups from Toronto
Musical groups established in 1994
Alien8 Recordings artists
1994 establishments in Ontario